Homer is an unincorporated community in northern Burlington Township, Licking County, Ohio, United States.  It has a post office with the ZIP code 43027.  It lies along State Route 661 between Granville and Mount Vernon.

History
Homer was laid out in 1816. The community was named after Homer, an ancient Greek poet. A post office called Homer has been in operation since 1831.

Notable person
 Victoria Woodhull, suffragist and first female candidate for President of the United States.

References

Unincorporated communities in Licking County, Ohio
1816 establishments in Ohio
Unincorporated communities in Ohio